Maharoof, or Mahroof, is a Sri Lankan surname. The name is derived from the Arabic word "ma'ruf" or "miftahul ma'ruf", an Islamic term meaning that which is commonly known or acknowledged. Notable people with the name include:

Farveez Maharoof (born 1984), Sri Lankan cricketer
Imran Maharoof (born 1983), Sri Lankan politician
M. A. M. Maharoof (born 1957), Sri Lankan politician
M. E. H. Maharoof (1939–1997), Sri Lankan politician
Mohamed Mahroof (1950–2012), Sri Lankan politician

See also
 Ma'ruf